Joshewa Leandro Frederick-Charlery (born 24 January 1997) is a Caymanian footballer who plays as a centre-back for the Cayman Islands national team.

College career
Frederick-Charley started his college career at Northwest Kansas Technical College.  He made 9 appearances with the team.

He transferred to Longwood University in 2017, where he made 4 appearances, scoring one goal.

Career statistics

Club

Notes

International

References

External links
 Joshewa Frederick-Charlery at CaribbeanFootballDatabase
 Joshewa Frederick-Charlery at Northwest Kansas Technical College
 Joshewa Frederick-Charlery at Longwood University

1997 births
Living people
People from Grand Cayman
Caymanian footballers
Cayman Islands international footballers
Association football defenders
Cayman Islands Premier League players
Kakkonen players
Bodden Town F.C. players
Longwood Lancers men's soccer players
Oulun Työväen Palloilijat players
Liga III players
Caymanian expatriate footballers
Expatriate soccer players in the United States
Caymanian expatriate sportspeople in the United States
Expatriate footballers in Finland
Expatriate footballers in Romania